The Sydney–Melbourne co-axial cable was a major telecommunications engineering and construction project in south-eastern Australia in the early 1960s, designed to significantly increase telecommunications transmission capacity between Sydney and Melbourne and other centres, along its route including Canberra.
  
Key points along the route were Sydney, Liverpool, Campbelltown, Bowral, Goulburn, Canberra, Yass, Gundagai, Wagga Wagga, Culcairn, Albury, Wangaratta, Benalla, Euroa, Seymour and Melbourne.

It was five years in the making and cost £6.89 million to complete. Its prime purpose was to boost the capacity for telecommunications between the two major cities. The cable was made up of three pairs of tubes, each pair capable of carrying 1,260 simultaneous telephone connections.
There was a marker stone commemorating the official opening of the cable at 532 Hume Highway, Casula but it has since been removed. There is a corresponding marker stone in Gordon Reserve near Parliament House, Melbourne.

Origins 
The volume of telephone traffic in Australia increased significantly after World War II. As a result, by the 1950s the trunk network was becoming congested. The Postmaster-General's Department (PMG) was also pursuing a policy of automating the telephone and telegraph systems, including the introduction of subscriber-to-subscriber (rather than operator-assisted) long-distance calls. It was therefore decided, in 1957, that a new high capacity link would be installed between Sydney and Melbourne (via Canberra).

A number of systems were considered, including radio transmission. Eventually the decision was taken to install a 6 tube coaxial cable. While this provided more capacity than was necessary at the time, it also allowed for the transmission of television signals along the route. The associated carrier equipment (e.g. the active electronics) was to have sufficient capacity for the first 5 years with facilities for readily increasing the number of channels to meet demand for the next 20 years.

Construction 
Tenders to supply the cable and other equipment were undertaken and the main supplier, Felten and Guilleaume (West Germany) was selected in early 1959. The details of the contracts were finalised by mid-1959. The cable for the Canberra-Melbourne link was manufactured by a subcontractor (Olympic Cables) in Australia. The remaining cable and carrier equipment were manufactured in West Germany. Construction work was undertaken by staff of the PMG.
The initial shipment of cable arrived from Germany at the end of 1959. Cable laying was completed in October 1961 and jointing and testing completed in December 1961.

In total, over 960 kilometres of cable were laid and over one million tons of rock and soil excavated to lay the cable. Main repeater stations (which were attended by staff) were constructed every 64 kilometres and minor, unmanned repeater stations every 9 kilometres (103 in total. The main repeater stations also provided break out points to connect minor trunk routes to regional towns (e.g. Goulburn, Yass, Gundagai). Many of the repeater stations remain today along the route, along with cable markers and other reminders of the project.

Opening and impact 
The Sydney–Melbourne coaxial cable was officially opened on 9 April 1962 when Prime Minister Robert Menzies, made an interstate direct dial call.
The coaxial cable infrastructure supported the introduction of subscriber trunk dialling between the cities and live television link-ups. After its commissioning in April 1962 the cable carried telegraph and telephone traffic. It also provided the first inter-city television transmission in Australia, allowing simultaneous television broadcasting in Melbourne and Sydney for the first time.

The cable is understood to be decommissioned, superseded long ago by competing optical fibre cables operated by firms such as Telstra, Optus and NextGen.

A large number of concrete repeater stations remain along the cable's route as a reminder of its past role, for example, at Sutton Forrest, Wollogorang, Collector and Wallaroo.

In April 2012 the Minister Communications, Stephen Conroy, issued a media release commemorating the 50th anniversary of the cable, and drawing a parallel between its forward-looking nature and his proposed National Broadband Network.

Television 
TCN9 and GTV9 were connected via the coaxial cable in 1963, allowing the instant sharing of news stories and programs between both cities.
The cable supported the simultaneous live broadcast of the 5th test of the 1962–63 Ashes series from the Sydney Cricket Ground to Sydney, Canberra and Melbourne – a major milestone in Australian television history.

The cable was also used in 1965 for innovative interstate live split-screen link-ups between Graham Kennedy's In Melbourne Tonight and Don Lane's Sydney Tonight.

References

Further reading 
Special issue of the Telecommunication Journal of Australia, v.13 no.3, Feb. 1962., available at the National Library of Australia, catalogue number, Npf 621.38780994 TEL.
Conroy, S, '50th anniversary of the Sydney–Melbourne coaxial cable', 12 April 2012
http://monumentaustralia.org.au/display/32293-coaxial-cable
http://catalogue.nla.gov.au/Search/Home?lookfor=my_parent%3A%22(AKIN)24154127%22&iknowwhatimean=1
http://www.abc.net.au/tv/50years/didyouknow/firsts.htm
http://www.telstra.com.au/abouttelstra/company-overview/history/tele-communications-timeline/

Telecommunications in Australia
Telecommunications-related introductions in 1962
1962 establishments in Australia